Nyls Korstanje (born 5 February 1999) is a Dutch swimmer.

He competed in the 4×100 m mixed freestyle relay event at the 2018 European Aquatics Championships, winning the silver medal.

Personal bests

References

External links
 

1999 births
Living people
Dutch male breaststroke swimmers
Dutch male freestyle swimmers
European Aquatics Championships medalists in swimming
Swimmers at the 2020 Summer Olympics
Olympic swimmers of the Netherlands
World Aquatics Championships medalists in swimming
Medalists at the FINA World Swimming Championships (25 m)
NC State Wolfpack men's swimmers
21st-century Dutch people
People from Sneek
Sportspeople from Friesland